Campylobacter mucosalis was initially isolated in 1974 by Lawson and Rowland from the lesions of porcine intestinal adenomatosis. Isolated species were gram-negative, microaerophilic and curve shaped. These organisms resembled Campylobacter sputorum in their morphological and phenotypic characteristics and were given the name Campylobacter sputorum subsp. mucosalis. A study, using DNA homology experiments, found that Campylobacter sputorum subsp. mucosalis is a distinct species and is not a subspecies of C. sputorum. Thus, its name was changed to Campylobacter mucosalis.

Description 
The cells are short, irregularly curved, and gram-negative and may appear as spiral forms 0.25 to 0.3 μm in diameter and 1 to 3 μm long. They move using a single polar flagellum. Coccoid bodies and filaments may be seen in older cultures. Colonies are 1.5 mm in diameter, circular, and raised with surfaces. The colonies have a dirty yellow color that is best seen by smearing a colony on a piece of white paper. Requires either hydrogen or formate as an electron donor for growth. Grows under microaerophilic conditions (6% O2, 5% CO2, 15% H2, 74% N2) where O2 serves as the electron acceptor or anaerobic with fumarate as the terminal electron acceptor.

Procurement 
Isolated from the intestinal mucosa of pigs with porcine intestinal adenomatosis, necrotic enteritis, regional ileitis and proliferative hemorrhagic enteropathy, also isolated from the oral cavities of pigs.

Distinguishing characteristics 
Campylobacter mucosalis strains can be distinguished from all other catalase-negative Campylobacter strains except C. concisus by their requirement for H2 or formate for microaerophilic growth and H2 fumarate or formate and fumarate for anaerobic growth. Although C. concisus strains are similar to C. mucosalis in phenotypic characteristics, they have only a very low level of DNA homology with C. mucosalis.

Cases of human infection 
Two cases of infection in children were reported in 1993. They recovered without the use of antimicrobial therapy.

References

External links
Type strain of Campylobacter mucosalis at BacDive -  the Bacterial Diversity Metadatabase

Campylobacterota
Bacteria described in 1981